The 2022–23 Penn State Nittany Lions basketball team represented Pennsylvania State University in the 2022–23 NCAA Division I men's basketball season. They are led by second-year head coach Micah Shrewsberry and play their home games at the Bryce Jordan Center in University Park, Pennsylvania as members of the Big Ten Conference. Penn State made the NCAA Tournament for the first time since 2011. They also won their first tournament game since the 2001 tournament.

Previous season
The Nittany Lions finished the 2021–22 season 14–17, 7–13 in Big Ten play to finish in a three-way tie for 10th place. As the No. 11 seed in the Big Ten tournament, they defeated Minnesota and Ohio State before losing to Purdue in the quarterfinals.

Offseason

Departures

Incoming transfers

Recruiting classes

2022 recruiting class

2023 recruiting class

Roster

Coaching Staff

Schedule and results

|-
!colspan=9 style=|Regular season

|-
!colspan=9 style=|Big Ten tournament

|-
!colspan=12 style=| NCAA Tournament

Source

References

Penn State Nittany Lions basketball seasons
Penn State
Penn State
Penn State